Two Swedish general elections were held in 1914:
The Swedish general election of 27 March 1914
The Swedish general election of 25 September 1914

See also
 Elections in Sweden